This is a list of film festivals that take place (or took place) in Canada. Where relevant, the list below notes when a festival is considered a qualifying festival for the purposes of the Canadian Screen Awards.

National

Alberta

British Columbia

Manitoba

New Brunswick

Newfoundland and Labrador

Northwest Territories

Nova Scotia

Nunavut

Ontario

Prince Edward Island

Quebec

Saskatchewan

Yukon

See also

List of film festivals

References 

Canada
Film festivals

Canada